Murhat (Finnish for "murders") is the seventh studio album by the Finnish dark metal band Ajattara. It was released in 2011 on Osasto-A Records.

Track listing

Personnel
 Ruoja - vocals
 Tartunta - guitars
 Tohtori Kuolio - bass, backing vocals
 Malakias IV - drums
 Raajat - keyboards, backing vocals
 Kalmos - guitars, backing vocals

2011 albums
Ajattara albums